Cameo Comedies is a brand of short comedy films made in the United States. The films are one-reel shorts from Jack White's Educational Pictures and Colonial Motion Picture Corporation. Three of the productions utilized 3D stereoscopic effects in the titles. The films were produced for $5,000 each. They were made from 1922 to 1932, spanning the silent film and talkie eras.

Cliff Bowes, Phil Dunham and Lupino Lane were among the actors. Supporting actors included Wallace Lupino, Anna Styers and Virginia Vance.

Mermaid Comedies were Educational's line of two-reelers.

Al Alt was a starring performer in a few of the Cameo films.

Filmography
Drenched (1924)
Sporting Life (1925)
Scrambled Eggs (1925)
The Lucky Duck
Kitty, Kitty
The Mad Rush
That's My Meat
One Quiet Night
Queenie of Hollywood
Once A Hero
The Tamale Vendor
Idle Roomers
Anybody's Goat
Bridge Wives
The Galloping Ghost
Honeymoom Trio
One Quiet Night
Smart Work
Hard Work, extant

See also
Film series
List of live action American short films
Tuxedo Comedies

References

Mass media companies established in 1922
Mass media companies disestablished in 1932
Silent film studios
Defunct American film studios
Film distributors of the United States
Film production companies of the United States
Defunct mass media companies of the United States